George Jonathan Dodo (17 August 1956 – 8 July 2022) was a Nigerian Roman Catholic prelate.

Dodo was born in Nigeria and was ordained to the priesthood in 1983. He served as the bishop of the Roman Catholic Diocese of Zaria, Nigeria, from 2000 until his death in 2022.

He was described as a modest and courageous leader by Catholic Charity Aid to the Church in Need, after his death.

References

1956 births
2022 deaths
Roman Catholic bishops of Zaria
Bishops appointed by Pope John Paul II